Looking for Langston is a 1989 British black-and-white film, directed by Isaac Julien and produced by Sankofa Film & Video Productions. It combines authentic archival newsreel footage of Harlem in the 1920s with scripted scenes to produce a non-linear impressionistic storyline celebrating black gay identity and desire during the artistic and cultural period known as the Harlem Renaissance in New York. The film has a runtime of about 42 minutes.

Critical synopsis
Opening the film is a voice-over of the original radio broadcast made in tribute to Langston Hughes upon his death in 1967 as the scene of his funeral is recreated and reinterpreted. Interspersed among such images as shifting time periods that seamlessly flow from past to present, black men dancing together within a revisionist version of the Cotton Club, or a speakeasy, and dream sequences, are brief narrative extracts from the poetic works of Hughes alongside those of Richard Bruce Nugent, James Baldwin, and Essex Hemphill. Also shown are the controversial images of black men by the photographer Robert Mapplethorpe.

The film is not a biography of Langston Hughes. It is a memoriam to Hughes and the Harlem Renaissance as reconstructed from a black gay perspective. Moreover, it purports to be a meditation on the black gay experience within a historical context built around the homophobia, oppression and denial faced by men of African descent within black communities alongside "allusions and political commentary on white racism."

Hughes is presented as an icon and cultural metaphor for black gay men who were confronted with being ostracized if they did not conform to black bourgeoisie standards whose overriding goal concerned fuller social integration. Contested are the ways the black male and his sexuality have been represented in the modern Western world and how existing notions of race and gender figure within American and African-American culture.

Throughout this process, the identity of Hughes as a black gay man is reclaimed and no longer denied, a process paralleled in the ever-growing academic studies of Hughes today. Moreover, adding to the historic and cinematic importance of the film in gay cinema, Looking for Langston was and continues to be one of very few films showing intra-racial affection between black gay men as revealed in the love story between the two leading black protagonists, Ben Ellison as Langston Hughes and Matthew Baidoo as Beauty.

Upon the first release of Looking for Langston in the United States in 1990, the estate of Langston Hughes initially attempted to have the film censored because of copyright violations: permission allegedly had not been obtained by the filmmakers permitting them to use the poetry of Hughes in the film. During subsequent screenings of Looking for Langston, the sound was repeatedly turned down when the work of Hughes was read.

Despite allegations of censorship from critics at the time of the U.S. premiere of the film, the estate had allowed many of Hughes' poems to appear in gay anthologies in the print media and continues to do so until this day.

Today it falls under the auspices of the British Film Institute as part of its national "Black World" initiative celebrating black creativity in film.

Cast
 Ben Ellison as Alex
 Matthew Baidoo as Beauty
 Akim Mogaji as James
 John Wilson as Gary
 Dencil Williams as Marcus
 Guy Burgess as Dean
 James Dublin as Carlos
 Harry Donaldson as Leatherboy
 Jimmy Somerville as Angel
 Stuart Hall as British voice (voice)
 Langston Hughes as himself (archive footage)

Awards
Teddy Award for Best Short Film at the 1989 Berlin International Film Festival. To celebrate the 30th anniversary of the Teddy Awards, the film was selected to be shown at the 66th Berlin International Film Festival in February 2016.

See also 
 African-American culture and sexual orientation

Notes

References
Appiah, Kwame Anthony; Henry Louis Gates (2003). Africana: The Concise Desk Reference. Philadelphia: Running Press Book Publishers. 
Blount, Marcellus; George P. Cunningham (1996). Representing Black Men. New York: Routledge.  
Mercer, Kobena (1994). Welcome to the Jungle: New Positions in Black Cultural Studies. New York: Routledge.  
Munoz, Jose Esteban (1999). Disidentifications: Queer of Color and the Performance of Politics (Cultural Studies of America, V.2). University of Minnesota Press. 
Rampersad, Arnold (1988). The Life of Langston Hughes Volume 2: I Dream A World. "Ask Your Mama!", p. 336. Oxford University Press. 
Smith, Valerie (ed.), (2003). Representing Blackness: Issues in Film and Video. New Jersey: Rutgers University Press. 
West, Sandra L. (2003), "Langston Hughes". In Aberjhani & Sandra West (eds), Encyclopedia of the Harlem Renaissance, p. 162. Checkmark Press.

Further reading
 Padva, Gilad (2014). "Black Nostalgia: Poetry, Ethnicity, and Homoeroticism in Looking for Langston and Brother to Brother". In Queer Nostalgia in Cinema and Pop Culture, pp. 199–226. Palgrave Macmillan, 2014. .

External links

 Metro Picture Gallery Exhibition of Looking for Langston.

1989 films
1989 LGBT-related films
British LGBT-related films
Films directed by Isaac Julien
Films set in Harlem
African-American LGBT-related films
African-American films
Black British films
American LGBT-related films
1980s English-language films
1980s American films
1980s British films